The Sabina School Park of Knowledge is a science museum in Santo André, São Paulo, Brazil. Other planetaria in Greater São Paulo include Professor Aristóteles Orsini Planetarium and Carmo Planetarium.

History 
The school was created by the Municipal Government of Santo André to provide scientific support to the municipal school network. Originally conceived in 2001, the construction of the building and the initial acquisition of the contents was completed in mid-2006. It was inaugurated on 11 February 2007. The building was designed by Paulo Mendes da Rocha.

Main pavilion 

Johannes Kepler Planetarium 
The planetarium, named after Johannes Kepler, is a -diameter dome containing 247 seats and 13 wheelchair spaces. It uses a Carl Zeiss AG Starmaster SB to project over 6,000 stars, along with two digital projectors covering the entire dome. Shows last around 30 minutes. It is open to the public on weekends and holidays.

References 

Science museums in Brazil
Planetaria
Buildings and structures in São Paulo